Zachary Laine Vincej (born May 1, 1991) is an American former professional baseball shortstop. He played in Major League Baseball (MLB) for the Cincinnati Reds and Seattle Mariners. Before beginning his professional career, Vincej played college baseball at Pepperdine University. Playing for the Pepperdine Waves, Vincej won the Brooks Wallace Award in 2012, given to the best shortstop in college baseball.

Amateur career
Vincej participated in PONY Baseball in the 14-and-under group. He also competed internationally for the United States national youth baseball team in 2007, winning the gold medal in the 2007 World Youth Baseball Championship. Vincej had a .583 batting average during the tournament.

Vincej attended Saugus High School in Santa Clarita, California, and played for the school's baseball team as their starting shortstop. He was a second-team all-league selection as a freshman in 2006, and a first-team selection in his next three seasons. He was named to the all-state team after his sophomore season.

Vincej enrolled at Pepperdine University, where he played college baseball for the Pepperdine Waves baseball team, starting in 2009. While he was in college, he played collegiate summer baseball for the Anchorage Bucs in the Alaska Baseball League in 2009 and 2010 and for the Hyannis Harbor Hawks of the Cape Cod Baseball League in 2011.

With the Waves, Vincej struggled in 2011, his sophomore season, recording a .194 batting average and committing 11 errors in 53 games played. However, he rebounded to bat .339 during the 2012 season, winning the Brooks Wallace Award as the top college baseball shortstop in the nation. With the highest fielding percentage of all shortstops in the West Coast Conference at .951, Vincej was also named the Conference's Defensive Player of the Year.

Professional career

Cincinnati Reds
The Cincinnati Reds drafted Vincej in the 37th round of the 2012 Major League Baseball Draft. He signed with the Reds and made his professional debut with the Billings Mustangs of the Rookie-level Pioneer League. He spent all of 2012 there, slashing .336/.393/.434 with one home run and 17 RBIs in 38 games. Vincej played for the Dayton Dragons of the Class A Midwest League in 2013, and was named to the league's all-star game. In 104 games, he batted .263 with three home runs and 31 RBIs. Vincej played for the Bakersfield Blaze of the Class A-Advanced California League in 2014, posting a .271 batting average with one home run and 40 RBIs in 115 games, and the Pensacola Blue Wahoos of the Class AA Southern League in 2015 where he batted .241 with five home runs and 22 RBIs in 90 games. He returned to Pensacola in 2016 where he batted .281 with three home runs and 47 RBIs in 121 games. After the 2016 regular season, the Reds assigned Vincej to the Peoria Javelinas of the Arizona Fall League.

Vincej began the 2017 season with the Louisville Bats of the Class AAA International League. There, he batted .270 with three home runs and 38 RBIs in 110 games. The Reds promoted Vincej to the major leagues on September 1, 2017.

Seattle Mariners
On November 3, 2017, Vincej was claimed off waivers by the Seattle Mariners. The Mariners outrighted Vincej to the Triple-A Tacoma Rainiers on November 7. Vincej was promoted to the major leagues on July 30, 2018. He was designated for assignment on August 21, 2018. He declared free agency on October 2, 2018.

Baltimore Orioles
On November 16, 2018, Vincej signed a minor league deal with the Baltimore Orioles. He spent the year with the Triple-A Norfolk Tides without receiving a call-up to the majors. He elected free agency on November 4, 2019.

Seattle Mariners (second stint)
On June 3, 2021, Vincej signed a minor league contract with the Seattle Mariners organization. He did not appear in a game and elected free agency following the season.

Coaching career
On January 31, 2022, Vincej joined the Seattle Mariners organization as a coach for the Triple-A Tacoma Rainiers. He was later named a bench coach alongside 2018 Tacoma teammate Seth Mejias-Brean.

On April 20, he made his first appearance on a major league coaching staff, serving as the interim first base coach, while manager Scott Servais was unavailable after testing positive for COVID-19 and Kristopher Negron served as interim. The Mariners beat the Texas Rangers that day under Negrón's management.

On January 26, 2023, Vincej was announced as the manager for the Single-A Modesto Nuts for the 2023 season.

References

External links

1991 births
Living people
People from Saugus, Santa Clarita, California
Baseball players from San Diego
Major League Baseball shortstops
Cincinnati Reds players
Seattle Mariners players
Pepperdine Waves baseball players
Hyannis Harbor Hawks players
Billings Mustangs players
Dayton Dragons players
Bakersfield Blaze players
Pensacola Blue Wahoos players
Peoria Javelinas players
Louisville Bats players
Tacoma Rainiers players
Norfolk Tides players
Anchorage Bucs players